This is a list of listed buildings in Gentofte Municipality, Denmark.

The list

2820 Gentofte

2870 Dyssegård

2900 Hellerup

2920 Charlottenlund

2930 Klampenborg

See also
 List of churches in Gentofte Municipality

References

External links

 Danish Agency of Culture
 Kulturmiljøer

 
Gentofte